The electricity sector in Iceland is 99.98% reliant on renewable energy: hydro power, geothermal energy and wind energy. 

Iceland's consumption of electricity per capita was seven times higher than EU 15 average in 2008. The majority of the electricity is sold to industrial users, mainly aluminium smelters and producers of ferroalloy. The aluminum industry in Iceland used 71% of produced electricity in 2011.

Landsvirkjun is the country's largest electricity producer. The largest companies in the retail market are RARIK, Orkuveita Reykjavíkur and Hitaveita Suðurnesja. Electricity production increased significantly between 2005 and 2008 with the completion of Iceland's largest hydroelectric dam, Kárahnjúkar Hydropower Plant (690MW). Iceland's national electrical grid is owned and run by Landsnet and is composed of 3,000 km of transmission lines and 70 or so substations.

Production and Consumption
Iceland's electricity is produced almost entirely from renewable energy sources: hydroelectric (70%) and geothermal (30%). Less than 0.02% of electricity generated came from fossil fuels (in this case, fuel oil). In 2013 a pilot wind power project was installed by Landsvirkjun, consisting of two 77m high turbines with an output of 1.8MW.  

There are plans to increase wind power share in Iceland, with many onshore and offshore wind farm opportunities.
According to Statistics Iceland the total electricity consumption was 7,958 GWh in 2002, 11,480 GWh in 2007, and 17,068 GWh in 2012. Electricity production increased by 24 MWh/person from 2005 to 2008, an increase of 83%.

Two remote islands disconnected from the Icelandic grid rely on diesel generators, Grímsey and Flatey.

Transmission 

The Icelandic Transmission System Operator (TSO) is Landsnet, a company jointly owned by three state-owned power companies: RARIK, Landsvirkjun and Orkubú Vestfjarða. The Icelandic TSO is compensated for all transmission costs by retail and wholesale distributors. Landsnet's transmission network operates at voltages of 220kV, 132kV and a few 66kV lines and serves the whole country and is composed of 3,000 km of transmission lines and around 70 substations.

Connection to the rest of Europe 

There are plans to connect the Icelandic grid with the UK using a subsea High-Voltage DC (HVDC) interconnector, with a potential capacity of up to 1.2GW, called Icelink. It would be the world's longest HVDC cable, if built. This would allow Iceland to export excess energy to UK and in turn linking it to a wider European super grid. The project is in planning stages and is controversial in Iceland due to fears of increased domestic electricity prices as well as environmental damage from the resulting increase in power plants.

In the 2019 UK General Election 2019, the Democratic Unionist Party included in their manifesto a version of Icelink in which Iceland would instead be connected to Northern Ireland.

Distribution 
Electricity distribution is controlled by the following local utilities with local monopolies:

 Veitur (Reykjavík and Capital Region)
 RARIK (Nationwide and rural areas)
 Orkubú Vestfjarða (Westfjords)
 Norðurorka (Akureyri and surrounding area)
 HS Veitur (Reykjanes peninsula, Selfoss, Vestmannaeyjar and Hafnafjörður)

Competition
The Icelandic electricity market is geographically isolated. The market was closed for competition prior to 1 July 2003. Almost all electricity was supplied by Landsvirkjun and sold through regional distribution companies. Landsvirkjun had a monopoly position on investment in generation. Full market opening began in 2006 e.g. with the opportunity to switch supplier. Contracts for large scale energy users were in general long term, up to 30 years with options for extension.

Landsvirkjun, the largest electricity producer, had 76% annual production in 2007.The majority of the electricity is used in industry, mainly aluminium smelters and producers of ferroalloy. Landsvirkjun does not participate directly in the retail market for households and smaller businesses.

In the retail market the main companies are RARIK, Orkuveita Reykjavíkur and Hitaveita Suðurnesja.The last two have also entered into the market for energy intensive users. The households heated with electricity, not many, receive subsidies to make their heating costs comparable to hot water heating.

Orkusalan was established as a joint venture between Landsvirkjun, and two large operators. The companies involved produced the majority of all electricity and own about 98 percent of the hydro power generation. The joint venture would have provided about 40 percent of the household electricity. According to the Icelandic Competition Authority the joint venture would have strengthen a dominant position of Landsvirkjun. The parties suggested that Landsvirkjun would pull out of the project, and subject to that condition the merger was allowed to proceed. Orkusalan commenced operation without Orkubu Vestfjarða. The later development should be updated.

As of 2022, new retail resellers of electricity have come to market such as N1 Rafmagn, Straumlind and Orka Heimilanna. They have wholesale agreements to resell electricity mostly from Landsvirkjun.

See also 

 Energy in Iceland
 List of power stations in Iceland

References